is a military aerodrome of the Japan Ground Self-Defense Force .

It was called "Lanier Airfield" by the Allied Powers during the Occupation of Japan.

References

Airports in Japan
Transport in Miyagi Prefecture
Japan Ground Self-Defense Force bases
Buildings and structures in Miyagi Prefecture
1937 establishments in Japan
Sendai